Kristian Keqi (born 28 July 1996) is an Albanian professional footballer who currently play as an attacking midfielder for Maltese club Floriana.

References

1996 births
Living people
Footballers from Florence
Albanian footballers
Association football midfielders
Association football forwards
Delfino Pescara 1936 players
Potenza S.C. players
A.S.D. Città di Foligno 1928 players
Scandicci Calcio players
A.S.D. Sangiovannese 1927 players
S.S. Arezzo players
Floriana F.C. players
Serie C players
Serie D players
Maltese Premier League players
Italian footballers
Italian expatriate sportspeople in Malta
Albanian expatriate sportspeople in Malta
Italian expatriate footballers
Albanian expatriate footballers
Expatriate footballers in Malta